Anna Graceman is an American singer, songwriter and recording artist whose self-penned songs and music have garnered national recognition. She has been featured on The Ellen DeGeneres Show, America's Got Talent, and CBS News,

On June 1, 2020, Graceman appeared on NBC's show Songland starring Ryan Tedder, Shane McAnally, and Ester Dean. The episode featured recording artist Bebe Rexha, who combined Graceman's song with that of fellow contestant Greg Scott and chose the song as the episode's winner. The song will be recorded by Rexha and will be used by NBC to promote the Tokyo Olympics.

On May 29, 2020, Graceman released her latest studio album, The Way The Night Behaves.

Early life
Anna Graceman was born in Juneau, Alaska, to a stay-at-home mother, who played classical music to her before she was born. At three months old, Graceman's parents started displaying flashcards for her to read and gain word association. This sparked the love of writing music. By the time she was 18 months old, she had memorized the lyrics of many classical and modern tunes. At the age of two, Graceman was not afraid of singing in front of crowds.

When she was four, she could play the piano fluently. At the age of 6 years old she wrote her first song, "So I Cried". Graceman states that her family was poor while growing up in Alaska. The mini-van that her mother drove didn't have a working radio or CD player in it, so her mother would sing to her while they were driving. Driving time meant singing time. Later in 2011, at the age of 11, she gained wider popularity with her performances in the sixth season of the America's Got Talent competition. In 2013, she performed 43 shows at The Palazzo Theater in The Venetian Hotel and Resort for eight weeks. Her performances there brought her critical acclaim. Graceman has a substantial online presence. Collectively, her YouTube views exceed 150 million views. Her America's Got Talent audition video alone has over 35 million views as of December 23, 2013. In 2012, Disney approached Graceman and requested the right to non-exclusively license her early original YouTube videos. They can be found in the video section of Disney's website. In April 2013, the International Songwriting Competition announced that Graceman had been announced as one of their finalists. The judges include such notable songwriters as Tom Waits, Jeff Beck, Bernie Taupin and Mark Foster In 2014, Anna Graceman stated that she had moved to Nashville, Tennessee to pursue her songwriting and work with the musicians there.

In September 2016, Relix Magazine said, "This is hardly a run-of-the-mill adolescence, Graceman has stayed grounded through it all, remembering where she came from and how it all started."

Singer songwriter
From ages 6 to 16, Graceman had reportedly written, released and performed 70 of her songs, many of which were self-released as singles and album compilations. She writes both the lyrics and the melodies for all of her songs, and typically only sings and performs her own material. Nearly all of her known songs have been released by her on her YouTube and Soundcloud channels.

Notable appearances and performances
October 7, 2009 – Ellen: Graceman appeared on The Ellen DeGeneres Show and performed an original song she wrote called "Paradise". DeGeneres praised her performance. Graceman said that her family had been putting videos up on YouTube since April 2008. She uploaded "Paradise" in August 2009. Someone at YouTube took notice of the video, and decided to feature her among a small group of child musicians. After watching Graceman's "Paradise" video, DeGeneres invited her to sing it on the show. (Graceman said it was great fun and a great experience.) During that episode, DeGeneres invited her back to meet Taylor Swift on a subsequent show.

April 20, 2010 – 36th Alaska Folk Festival: Graceman performed at the annual festival along with other folk and bluegrass bands. A local reviewer stated, "There were several sets where the young and gifted stole the show, making me realize I was watching Juneau's version of "Who's Got Talent" – particularly when 10-year-old Anna Graceman sang all her original songs."

Summer, 2011 – America's Got Talent Season Six: At her audition, Graceman performed "If I Ain't Got You" by Alicia Keys while accompanying herself on the keyboard. She received a standing ovation from Howie Mandel, Piers Morgan, and Sharon Osbourne, the show's three judges. Her audition video went viral and caught the attention of the mainstream press. The video garnered over 28 million views on YouTube, the most of any America's Got Talent audition video. In the Vegas round, Graceman performed "Rolling in the Deep" by Adele, again playing the keyboard. In the quarterfinals, she performed "What a Wonderful World" (Louis Armstrong). The judges' unanimous acclaim reflected the votes she gained, qualifying her for the semi-finals. Her self-accompanied performance of "Home Sweet Home" (Mötley Crüe) earned her another standing ovation from the judges, and a spot in the Top 10. As the competition was becoming tougher and the judges expected more, Graceman went with something different for that round; her song was "True Colors" (Cyndi Lauper), but for the first time on the show, she performed without the keyboard. She fell short of making the finals.

October 28–30, 2011 – Caesars Palace Colosseum: Graceman participated in America's Got Talent Live along with other season six favorites, including Landon Swank, Team iLuminate, and winner Landau Eugene Murphy, Jr. At the request of Caesars Palace, she returned to the Colosseum for the following New Year's Eve concert.

February 25, 2013 – Palazzo-Venetian Theater Residency: Graceman performed at the Palazzo Theatre in the Venetian for seven weeks (43 shows). Famed reporter Robin Leach saw and wrote:

An unexpected teenage star was born Monday when ... Anna Graceman, just 13, stole the show! The triple-threat talent hails from the wilds of Alaska, but she sings well enough to rival Alicia Keys. She also plays piano as grand as Sir Elton John and writes songs as gifted as Adele and her idol, Taylor Swift. Incredibly, it's her second starring spot on The Strip. As an 11-year-old on Season 6 of the top-rated NBC series, Anna was part of the touring version when it stopped for two nights at Caesars Palace in 2011. Her debut album was released last year. It was an incredible performance Monday night. It won her wild applause and a standing ovation. The pint-sized charmer is one giant talent and here now for seven weeks. I know she will one day return to The Strip headlining in her own right.Anna Graceman is spectacular at the Palazzo  Retrieved on 2013-04-29

In June 2014, DJ Lulleaux, a Dutch music producer, released a remix of her song Words. As of 2020, it is his most popular track on SoundCloud, clocking 2.62 million plays.

August 28, 2014 – Inaugural YouTube Music Night in Los Angeles: Graceman performed at the first YouTube Music Night in Los Angeles. The event was held at the studios in the YoutubeSpaceLA facilities.

October 29, 2014 – Inaugural YouTube Music Night in Nashville, Tennessee: Graceman performed at the first YouTube Music Night in Nashville, Tennessee. The event was held at the Pinewood Social Event Center in downtown Nashville.

September 21, 2016 – 'Pilgrimage Music and Cultural Festival' (30k in attendance) Anna Graceman appeared on NBC with her band 'Graceman' to promote the festival .

September 25, 2016 - Pilgrimage Music Festival: Anna Graceman and the Graceman band performed at the 2nd annual Pilgrimage Festival in Franklin, TN. The line up included Beck, The Struts, Kacey Musgraves, Daryl Hall & John Oates, Kaleo, Shakey Graves, Cake, The Arcs, Anderson East to name a few. The Festival was produced by Executive Producers Kevin Griffin and Justin Timberlake. Anna Graceman appeared on NBC WSMV TV in Nashville to promote the festival. The estimated attendance of the festival was 30,000 people over two days.

June 1, 2020 - Songwriting Competition TV show Songland on NBC - Recording artist Bebe Rexha combined Graceman's song with that of fellow contestant Greg Scott and chose the song as the episode's winner.

Another Girl records
Anna Graceman records for her own independent label, Another Girl Records.

Graceman Band
Graceman performs with The Graceman Band, a trio that also includes Allie and Landon Graceman. Relix Magazine stated that "The now 16-year-old singer-songwriter, who has recently begun to make her mark in Nashville, writes and produces all her own songs and, over the past couple of years, has brought her younger siblings onboard to form a trio they call 'Graceman'." On October 4, 2016 Anna Graceman released the band's first full-length album titled ‘Rebel Days’; written and produced by Anna Graceman.
The band's style of music incorporates elements of folk, soul and rock. Its members are:
 Anna Graceman – piano, keyboards, bass, vocals
 Allie Graceman – guitar, vocals
 Landon Graceman – drums, percussion

Producer
Since the beginning of 2014, Graceman has produced all of her released music. These include "Speak to Me", "Living in Denial", "High Places", "Already Fallin", "IDK", "Miles Away", "Poison", "Never Meant to Me", "Leap of Faith", "Blink", "Heartbreaking Truth", "Remember", "Rain", as well as the full length 'Graceman' album "Rebel Days". Some of the selected musicians she has used in the production of her songs include Chuck Sabo, Brent Mason, Randy Hope-Taylor, John Hobbs, Jim Horn, Glenn Worf, Bobby Terry and Eddie Bayers

Musical influences
Graceman credits Ann Wilson (Heart), Amy Winehouse and Adele as her main inspirations.

Studio albums

References

External links
 

1999 births
America's Got Talent contestants
Living people
American child singers
American multi-instrumentalists
People from Juneau, Alaska
Singers from Alaska
21st-century American women guitarists
21st-century American guitarists
21st-century American women pianists
21st-century American pianists
Guitarists from Alaska
21st-century American women singers
21st-century American singers